The Sta. Rita Hills AVA is an American Viticultural Area located in Santa Barbara County, California. From its creation in 2001 through 2006, the wine appellation was officially named Santa Rita Hills AVA.  The formal name change was the result of a protest by and subsequent negotiations with Vina Santa Rita, a very large Chilean wine producer that was concerned about the AVA name diluting its international brand value.  The name change took effect on January 5, 2006, with a yearlong period for producers in the AVA to change their wine labels.

Geography   
Sta. Rita Hills is part of the larger Santa Ynez Valley AVA, located between the towns of Lompoc and Buellton with the Purisima Hills on the north and the Santa Rosa Hills on the south.  The wine region is exposed to fog and coastal breezes from the nearby Pacific Ocean.  The hills run east to west, which allows cool ocean breezes from the nearby Pacific Ocean to enter the valley created by the hills and create a cool mesoclimate.  When combined with the rocky nature of the area, the Santa Rita Hills area is well-suited for the growing of Pinot noir grapes, which tend to do well in cool climates with rocky soil.  The region is best known for Chardonnay, Pinot noir, and Syrah varietal wines.

Wine industry
Several wineries are located in and around the Sta. Rita Hills AVA.  Wineries and locations in the Sta. Rita Hills AVA were featured in the 2004 U.S. film Sideways. Sideways Fest is an annual three-day event hosted by the Sta. Rita Hills Wine Alliance celebrating the anniversary of the movie's filming in the Santa Ynez Valley.

See also

Fiddlehead Cellars

References

External links
 Sta. Rita Hills Winegrowers Alliance
  Santa Ynez Wine Country Association
 TTB AVA map

American Viticultural Areas of California
American Viticultural Areas of Southern California
Santa Ynez Valley
Geography of Santa Barbara County, California
American Viticultural Areas
2001 establishments in California